Neoregelia camorimiana is a species of flowering plant in the genus Neoregelia. This species is endemic to Brazil.

Cultivars
 Neoregelia 'Aldeia'
 Neoregelia 'Pacquito'

References

BSI Cultivar Registry Retrieved 11 October 2009

camorimiana
Flora of Brazil